Grigor Topalli (born 1 November 1992 in Korçë) is an Albanian professional footballer who currently plays for Greek lower league side Keravnos Perni as a forward.

Club career
He has previously played for Aris Thessaloniki in Greece at youth level and for Skënderbeu Korçë in the Albanian Superliga.

References

External links
Profile at Football Database

1992 births
Living people
Footballers from Korçë
Albanian footballers
Association football forwards
KF Skënderbeu Korçë players
Anagennisi Epanomi F.C. players
Pierikos F.C. players
Vataniakos F.C. players
Episkopi F.C. players
Kallithea F.C. players
Achilleas Neokaisareia F.C. players
Thesprotos F.C. players
Kategoria Superiore players
Albanian expatriate footballers
Expatriate footballers in Greece
Albanian expatriate sportspeople in Greece